Fala Chen (born 24 February 1982) is a Chinese American actress. She is known for her roles in Marvel Cinematic Universe superhero film Shang-Chi and the Legend of the Ten Rings and HBO miniseries Irma Vep and The Undoing. 

Chen gained recognition through her roles in Hong Kong TVB drama series including Steps, No Regrets, Triumph in the Skies II, and Lives of Omission. She also starred in the Hong Kong films Tales from the Dark 2 (2013) and Turning Point (2009), as well as Despicable Me 3 (2017 – Cantonese). On stage, she portrayed Kyra Hollis in Skylight by David Hare (2016). In 2018, Chen wrote, directed and starred in the short film Passinger, which was a finalist for the Sundance Film Festival: Hong Kong Short Film Competition. She made her first Hollywood appearance in the HBO miniseries The Undoing in 2020 and starred in the Marvel Cinematic Universe superhero film Shang-Chi and the Legend of the Ten Rings in 2021.

Early life and education 
Chen was born on 24 February 1982, and raised in Chengdu, Sichuan, China until the age of 14, when she immigrated to Atlanta, Georgia, United States with her parents. Graduating from high school within the top 10 of her cohort, she went on to pursue a course in Marketing and International Business in Emory University's Goizueta Business School in May 2005.

During her college term breaks, Chen took part in several pageants as a means to pay for her tuition fees. Amongst them was the Miss Chinese International Pageant 2005 hosted in Hong Kong by TVB where she represented New York City after winning Miss New York Chinese 2004. She won 1st runner-up, kicking off her career in entertainment.

In 2014, Chen began a 4-year Master of Fine Arts in Drama (MFA) Program at the Juilliard School in New York City. She graduated in May 2018.

Career

Television

2005–06: Entry to the TV scene 
In 2005, Chen began her professional acting career when she signed an 8-year contract with TVB. She started out as a host on numerous variety shows on TVB's Mandarin channel TVB8, before making her acting debut in the TVB series Forensic Heroes guest starring as a murderess.

2007–09: Breakthrough 

In 2007, after starring in Heart of Greed, The Family Link, and Steps, Chen won her first acting award in the Best Supporting Actress category for her role in Steps. Additionally, she was also nominated for "My Favorite Female Character" and "Most Improved Actress" categories for the same role. She also received a nomination in the "Most Improved Actress" category for her roles in Heart of Greed and The Family Link in 2007.

Chen's breakthrough came in 2008, when her notable work was for the character of Gam Wing Hing (a mute girl) in TVB series Moonlight Resonance, an indirect sequel to Heart of Greed, as she had to learn sign language for the role. The role landed her nominations in the "Best Supporting Actress" and "My Favorite Female Character" categories for the second year in a row.

In 2009, Chen was nominated again for the "Best Supporting Actress" and "My Favorite Female Character" categories for her role in The Stew of Life.

2010–13: Leading roles and entry to the music scene 

In 2010, Chen was cast in TVB's grand production series No Regrets as second female lead, securing her position as one of Hong Kong's celebrated new actresses, alongside Tavia Yeung, Linda Chung, Myolie Wu, and Kate Tsui. The role won her the Best Supporting Actress Award at the TVB Anniversary Awards and Best Actress in a Supporting Role at the 16th Asian Television Awards.

She later took on roles as the first female lead in productions including Lives of Omission, Queens of Diamonds and Hearts, and Triumph in the Skies II. Lives of Omission (2011) was a distant sequel to the 2009 film Turning Point in which Chen had also acted in as the sister of a triad boss. Queens of Diamonds and Hearts (2012) allowed Chen to experiment with looking 'ugly' on screen as her character Chung Mo Yim, based on historical figure Zhongli Chun, was born with a prominent birth mark on her face. Chen played the role of Holiday Ho in Triumph in the Skies II —a free-spirited punk girl who aspires to fly—who became emotionally entangled between two male leads, Captain Samuel Tong played by Francis Ng and Captain Jayden Koo played by Julian Cheung. Chen also starred in 2013's Will Power alongside veteran actors Wayne Lai and Moses Chan where she played the role of Sam Yuet Kan, a junior barrister with a tough personality.

Her contract with TVB ended in mid 2013 and Chen became a self-managed artiste. Having more freedom to choose and ever so determined to become a better actress, Chen would like to direct her focus on filming more movies and dramas, and she is not afraid to take up new challenges.

2014: Entry into China's TV industry 

Chen acted in her first mainland Chinese drama series, Sound of the Desert, where she played the role of Li Yan. It aired in 2014 and was based on the historical romance novel Ballad of the Desert by Tong Hua.

2019: Entry into the US TV industry 

Shortly after graduating from the Juilliard School, Chen was cast as Jolene in The Undoing alongside Nicole Kidman and Hugh Grant.

Film

2009: Newcomer 
In 2009, Chen took her chance at her first female lead role in the movie Turning Point as Michael Tse's girlfriend and Francis Ng's sister. Turning Point is a spin-off from the 2009 TVB crime drama E.U., where the character "Laughing Gor", played by Michael Tse, became a household name.

Chen was nominated for the Best New Performer category at the 29th Hong Kong Film Awards for her role in Turning Point.

2010–13: Budding film actress 

In 2010, Chen starred in two movies, Black Ransom and 72 Tenants of Prosperity. In Black Ransom, she acted as a superintendent, alongside internationally acclaimed Hong Kong actor and film producer, Simon Yam. 72 Tenants of Prosperity on the other hand, was a light-hearted Hong Kong comedy film directed by Eric Tsang, involving a star-studded cast of Hong Kong stars.

Chen took to the movie scene again in 2011, acting in the first installment of the heartwarming I Love Hong Kong film series, directed and produced by Eric Tsang. She too worked together with Eric Tsang again who produced and acted in The Fortune Buddies, another Hong Kong comedy film which also co-stars Louis Yuen, Wong Cho-lam and Johnson Lee who are better known as "Fuk Luk Sau".

Tales from the Dark 2 (2013) was her first shot at the horror movie scene, and acting with her is Gordon Lam. Chen's story revolves around pillow demons, where her character Chow Jing Ee is seen to suffer from serious insomnia after her break-up with her boyfriend Yuen Hao Hong, played by Gordon Lam. Chen delivered a stellar performance, and was commended for the preparation work she did prior to filming, by staying a few nights alone in the cold apartment they filmed at to get into character and understand the loneliness and insomnia that the character suffered. The media had focused on the scene where Chen's character accidentally killed her boyfriend and tried to get rid of the corpse by taking off all of his garments and putting him into a vacuum bag. This is the first time that Gordon Lam has gone fully nude in a film. Owing to the explicit scenes, the movie has received a Category III rating.

Chen starred in the Cantonese version of Despicable Me 3 as the voice of Lucy Wilde, an Anti-Villain League agent, Gru's wife and the girls' adoptive mother. Doing voiceover for an animation film for the first time, Chen commented that it requires a lot of energy and precision to sync with the character's lip movement and it takes capturing the unique sounds and myriad of nuances in personality to bring the character to life.

2015: Movies Pending Release 
Chen concluded filming for The Treasure, directed by Gordon Chan and Ronald Tsang.

2021: US feature debut 
Chen made her US film debut after being cast in the Marvel Cinematic Universe feature film Shang-Chi and the Legend of the Ten Rings as Ying Li. The movie is directed by Destin Daniel Cretton, and opened in theaters on 3 September 2021.

Theatre

2013–16: Stage Debut 
Ever since Chen's contract with Television Broadcasts Limited (TVB) concluded in 2013, she went on to pursue a 4-year Master of Fine Arts in Drama (MFA) Program at Juilliard School with the passion and determination to better herself as a professional artiste. The MFA Program only accepts 8 to 10 students each year, and encompasses areas such as production, directing, playwriting, pedagogy, and current trends in American and World Theater.

Chen's debut on the theatre stage came in 2016 with Skylight – the premiere of Chinese adaptation of the 1995 British play written by David Hare that debuted in West End and Broadway. The play was scheduled to run for 24 shows at the Hong Kong Academy for Performing Arts, but due to overwhelming responses, 11 additional shows were added, making that a total of 35 shows running across 1 July 2016 to 14 August 2016. Starring alongside Dayo Wong and Terrance Lau, Skylight was a sold-out show within a few hours, and it received plenty of raving positive reviews including praises for Chen's performance as a theatre actor.

Music 
Starting in 2009, Chen has been sporadically participating in the music scene, singing theme songs for The Stew of Life, Links to Temptation, and Queens of Diamonds and Hearts.

2012: First album – Beautiful Life 
In 2010, Chen signed under Stars Shine International and subsequently launched her first Canto-pop debut album, Beautiful Life, released on 31 July 2012. Some of the highlights from the album are "", "", and "Beautiful Life". Among these songs, "" was the first plugged song which garnered her awards in the Best Newcomer category across various music platforms such as 2012 TVB8 Golden Music Awards for the Bronze Award, 2012 Jade Solid Gold Best Ten Music Awards Presentation, and "2013 IFPI Hong Kong Top Sales Music Awards".

Within a week from the launch of her album, it had climbed up to first place on HMV's 'Asian Album Top Sales Chart'.

Her contract with Stars Shine International ended in 2012.

Endorsements 
Chen was the spokesperson for Olay in China, Hong Kong, and Taiwan. She was also Hong Kong Cancer Fund’s Pink Ambassador for the Pink Revolution Campaign, held every October to promote breast cancer awareness and raise funds to support free services for patients and their families.

Personal life 
In 2008, Chen married Hong Kong businessman (later actor) Daniel Sit. In 2011, she brought Sit to attend a church sermon delivered by friend and No Regrets costar Sheren Tang, hoping to expose him to the Christian faith. The couple divorced in 2013.

In 2019, Chen married French entrepreneur Emmanuel Straschnov. In February 2021, she announced that she had given birth to a daughter.

Filmography

Television

Film

Theatre

Discography

Albums

Awards

2013
 TVB Star Awards Malaysia 2013: Favourite TVB Character (Triumph in the Skies 2 – Holiday)
 2013 10th Huading Awards: Best Chinese Actress in TV Series (Queen of Diamonds and Hearts)
 2013 IFPI Hong Kong Top Sales Music Awards: Best Newcomer Award

2012
 StarHub TVB Awards 2012: My Favorite TVB Female Character (Queens of Diamonds and Hearts – Chung Mo-Yim) 
 2012 TVB8 Golden Music Awards: Best Newcomer Award (Bronze)
 2012 Jade Solid Gold Best Ten Music Awards Presentation: Newcomer Impact Award

2011
 16th Asian Television Award – Best Actress in a Supporting Role (No Regrets – Lau Ching)
 StarHub TVB Awards 2011: My Favorite TVB Female Character (No Regrets – Lau Ching) 
 Starhub TVB Awards 2011: Perfect Smile Award
 My AOD Malaysia My Favourite TVB Series Presentation 2011: My Favourite Top 15 Characters (Lives of Omission – Jodie) 
 My AOD Malaysia My Favourite TVB Series Presentation 2011: My Favourite Onscreen Couple (Lives of Omission – Fala Chen and Michael Tse)
 Next TV Awards: Top 10 Artist (No. 9)

2010
 TVB Anniversary Awards 2010 – Best Supporting Actress (No Regrets – Lau Ching)
 My AOD Malaysia My Favourite TVB Series Presentation 2010: Best Supporting Actress (No Regrets – Lau Ching)
 Next TV Awards: Top 10 Artist (No. 10)

2009
 Next TV Awards 2009: Hekura Stylish Female Artist
 StarHub TVB Awards 2009: My Favorite TVB Female Character (Moonlight Resonance – Gum Wing Hing)

2008
 Next TV Awards 2008: Hekura Acting Improvement Award
 Next TV Awards 2008: Most Promising Female Artist

2007
 TVB Anniversary Awards 2007 – Best Supporting Actress (Steps – Ching Ka-Man (Karmen))
 Next TV Awards 2007: Hekura Most Self-confident New Actress

2005
 Miss Chinese International 2005 – 1st runner up

2004
 Miss NY Chinese 2004 – Best MTV, Best Costume, and Miss Photogenic

2003
 Miss Chinatown USA 2003 – 1st runner up (officially known as Miss Chinese Chamber of Commerce 2003)

2002
 Miss Asian America 2002

See also

 Chinese people in New York City

References

External links

 Fala Chen on Sina Weibo
 
 

|-
! colspan="3" style="background: #DAA520;" | TVB Anniversary Awards
|-

|-
! colspan="3" style="background: #DAA520;" | Miss Chinese International Pageant
|-

Living people
21st-century Hong Kong actresses
Actresses from Chengdu
American expatriates in Hong Kong
American film actresses
American television actresses
Chinese beauty pageant winners
Chinese emigrants to the United States
Goizueta Business School alumni
Miss Asian America winners
Singers from Chengdu
TVB actors
American Protestants
Sichuanese Protestants
American people of Chinese descent
Chinese film actresses
Chinese television actresses
21st-century Chinese actresses
Hong Kong film actresses
Hong Kong television actresses
1982 births
21st-century American women
Juilliard School alumni